Joaquín Ignacio de Freitas (born 21 April 1978) is a former Uruguayan rugby union player. He played as a centre.

He played for Champagnat Rugby Club in the Campeonato Uruguayo de Rugby.

He had 21 caps for Uruguay, from 2000 to 2006, scoring 1 conversion and 2 penalties, 8 points in aggregate. He had his first game at the 23-12 win over Namibia, at 22 September 2000, in Montevideo, in a tour. He was called for the 2003 Rugby World Cup, where he played in two games, one as substitute, but did not score. He had his last cap at the 33-7 loss to the United States, at 7 October 2006, in Stanford, for the 2007 Rugby World Cup qualifyings.

References

External links
Joaquín de Freitas International Statistics

1978 births
Living people
Uruguayan rugby union players
Uruguay international rugby union players
Rugby union centres